Richard Hayes was Dean of Derry  from 1911 until 1921.

Early life and education
He was educated at Trinity College, Dublin and ordained in 1882.

Career
Hayes began his ecclesiastical career as a curate at  Derry Cathedral. He was Rector of Drumragh from 1893 to 1904; and of Templemore from 1904 until his elevation to the deanery.

Death
He died on 12 November 1938.

References

Alumni of Trinity College Dublin
Irish Anglicans
Deans of Derry
1938 deaths
Year of birth missing